Mohamed Mamoun (born 15 October 1981) is an Egyptian former professional tennis player.

Born in Cairo, Mamoun was attached to the city's Heliopolis Club and made his debut for the Egypt Davis Cup team in 2001. He had a best singles world ranking of 272, with two ITF Futures title wins. In 2007 he was a semi-finalist at the Samarkand Challenger and finished runner-up to Lamine Ouahab at the All-Africa Games in Algiers. He made his final Davis Cup appearance for Egypt in 2009 and later served as team captain.

ITF Futures finals

Singles: 7 (2–5)

Doubles: 15 (8–7)

References

External links
 
 
 

1981 births
Living people
Egyptian male tennis players
Sportspeople from Cairo
African Games medalists in tennis
African Games silver medalists for Egypt
African Games bronze medalists for Egypt
Competitors at the 2003 All-Africa Games
Competitors at the 2007 All-Africa Games